Cladonia apodocarpa, also known as the stalkless cladoniais or the stalkless cup lichen, is a species of cup lichen in the Cladoniaceae family. Found in North America, it was described as a new species by Charles Albert Robbins in 1925.

See also
List of Cladonia species

References

apodocarpa
Lichen species
Lichens described in 1925
Lichens of North America